Ellis Crispe (1562–1625) was a merchant, alderman and Sheriff of London.

He was born in Marshfield, Gloucestershire the son of Thomas Crispe and Elizabeth Steward. He was baptised on 23 May 1562. He was a member of the Salters Company. He was married to Hester (née Ireland) and had eight sons including Nicholas, Samuel and Tobias and three daughters, including Elizabeth.

He died shortly after being elected Sheriff and is buried in St Mildred, Bread Street. His lengthy will was proved on 7 November 1625 at the Prerogative Court of Canterbury. In his will, he made bequests to the poor of Bread Street, the town of Marshfield and the Officers of the Salters' Company.

References

Sheriffs of the City of London
People from Gloucestershire (before 1904)
1562 births
1625 deaths